The Olds Hall (also known as the Arroyo Gardens Hotel or Daytona Terrace Hotel), built in the 1920s, is a historic site in Daytona Beach, Florida, United States. It is located at 340 South Ridgewood Avenue. On September 23, 1993, it was added to the U.S. National Register of Historic Places.

The hall is now the site of the Good Samaritan Society.

References

External links
 Volusia County listings at National Register of Historic Places
 Volusia County listings at Florida's Office of Cultural and Historical Programs
 Daytona Beach Historical Trail at Historic Hiking Trails

National Register of Historic Places in Volusia County, Florida
Buildings and structures in Daytona Beach, Florida